Košice-Juh (literally: Košice-South) is a borough (city ward) of the city of Košice, Slovakia.

Historical landmarks
The oldest building in the borough is the Holy Spirit Church, erected in 1733.

Statistics
 Area: 
 Population: 23,030 (31 December 2017) 
 Density of population: 2,400/km² (31 December 2017) 
 District: Košice IV
 Mayor: Jaroslav Hlinka (as of 2018 elections)

Gallery

Climate

References

External links

 Official website of the Košice-Juh borough
 Article on the Košice-Juh borough at Cassovia.sk
Official website of Košice

Boroughs of Košice